John Bourke, 1st Earl of Mayo (circa 1705 – 1790), styled Lord Naas from 1775 to 1781 and Viscount Mayo from 1781 to 1785, was an Irish politician and peer who was MP for Naas (1727–60, 1768–72) and Old Leighlin (1760–68) and was created Earl of Mayo (1785).

Early life

He was the son of Richard Bourke and Catherine Minchin. He was descended from Gaelic nobles, and shared a common ancestor with Tibbot ne Long Bourke, 1st Viscount Mayo. He was educated at Trinity College, Dublin.

Career
In 1727, he was elected as the Member of Parliament for Naas, representing the seat in the Irish House of Commons until 1760. Between 1761 and 1768 he served as MP for Old Leighlin. He was re-elected for Naas in 1768, and held the seat until his elevation to the peerage in 1776. That year was created Baron Naas, of Naas in the County of Kildare, in the Peerage of Ireland. He assumed his seat in the Irish House of Lords, and on 13 January 1781 he was made Viscount Mayo, a title which had previously been held by his distant relations. On 24 June 1785 Bourke was made Earl of Mayo.

Family
Bourke married Mary Deane, daughter of Joseph Deane and Margaret Boyle, in 1726. Together they had three children. The Naas constituency was also represented by Bourke's son and grandson, the second and fourth earls.

Arms

References

|-

|-

Year of birth unknown
1790 deaths
John
Members of the Irish House of Lords
Irish MPs 1727–1760
Irish MPs 1761–1768
Irish MPs 1769–1776
Members of the Parliament of Ireland (pre-1801) for County Kildare constituencies
Members of the Parliament of Ireland (pre-1801) for County Carlow constituencies
Year of birth uncertain
Earls of Mayo
Peers of Ireland created by George III
Alumni of Trinity College Dublin
1705 births